A Personal History of the Australian Surf: Being the Confessions of a Straight Poofter Is an autobiographical documentary written and directed by Michael Blakemore in 1981 in which he plays his own father. The film was made on 16mm film and first screened in the United Kingdom at London's National Film Theater. It was subsequently shown by Channel 4 television. The sub-title of the piece is "...Being the Confessions of a Straight Poofter".

References

External links
A Personal History of the Australian Surf at Australian Screen Online

A Personal History of the Australian Surf at Oz Movies

Documentary films about surfing
Surfing in Australia
Autobiographical documentary films
1981 films
Australian surfing films
Australian sports documentary films